Duan Qing 段晴 (13 May 1953 – 26 March 2022) was a Chinese scholar of Indian and Iranian languages. She was a Professor of Indo-Iranian Studies and Boya Chair Professor of Peking University.

Life 
Born in Beijing on 13 May 1953, Duan Qing studied German at Peking University, 1971–1974. After gaining her MA in Indology under Ji Xianlin 季羨林 and Jiang Zhongxin 蔣忠新, she earned her Ph.D. in Hamburg, West Germany, in 1986. She majored in Middle Iranian Studies with Ronald Emmerick, and took Indology and Tibetology as minor fields under Lambert Schmithausen and Albrecht Wezler. She then returned to Peking University, where she had a life-long teaching career. She died on 26 March 2022.

Publications 
Duan Qing's publications, in Chinese, English, German and Japanese, include:
 Das Khotanische Aparimitāyuḥsūtra (1986)
 Bonini yufa rumen 波你尼語法入門 (Introduction into Pāṇini’s System) (2001)
 Yutian, fojiao, gujuan 于闐·佛教·古卷 (New Finds and Findings from Khotan) (2013)
 Zhongguo guojia tushuguan cang Xiyu wenshu, Yutianyu juan (1) 中國國家圖書館藏西域文書·于闐語卷（一）(Xinjiang Manuscripts Preserved in the National Library of China: Khotanese Remains, Part I) (2015)
 Qinghai Zangyiyao wenhua bowuguan cang Quluwen chidu 青海藏醫藥文化博物館藏佉盧文尺牘 (Kharoṣṭhī Documents Preserved in Qinghai Tibetan Medical Culture Museum) (2016)
 Yutianyu Wugoujingguang datuoluoni jing 于闐語無垢淨光大陀羅尼經 (A Scroll of Khotanese Raśmivimalaviśuddhaprabhā nāma Dhāraṇī) (2019)
 Shenhua yu yishi: Pojie gudai Yutian Qushu shang de wenming mima 神話與儀式：破解古代于闐氍毹上的文明密碼 (Myth and Ritual: Deciphering the Code of Civilizations on Qushu from Ancient Khotan) (2022).

References

External links 
 Duan Qing on Academia.edu
 Duan Qing on Worldcat

1953 births
2022 deaths
Academic staff of Peking University
Indologists
Philologists
Scientists from Beijing